Steve Bunin (born in Seattle, Washington) is a news anchor for Seattle NBC station KING-TV.  He won the 2021 Emmy Award as Best News Anchor in the Pacific Northwest and overall is a four-time Emmy Award winner and a 13-time nominee.

Career
Bunin was a sports anchor at five local news stations: WTVH-TV in Syracuse, New York in 1995-1996, where he worked alongside future ABC anchor David Muir, WICZ-TV in Binghamton, New York in 1997, KNAZ-TV in Flagstaff, Arizona from 1998-2000, WLAJ-TV in Lansing, Michigan from 2000-2001, and WOTV-TV in Battle Creek, Michigan from 2002-2003.

Bunin worked at ESPN from 2003 to 2012, hosting a variety of shows, most frequently Outside The Lines, SportsCenter and College Football Live.  He also hosted Baseball Tonight, NFL Live, Sports Reporters, ESPN Radio and numerous NCAA and pro sports events on ESPN and ESPN2.

From 2012 to 2014, he was the lead anchor for Comcast SportsNet Houston before the network went bankrupt.  In both of his years at the network, Bunin was nominated for the Texas Emmy Awards for Best Sports Anchor, winning an Emmy for his 2014, 60-minute interview special with Carl Lewis.

From 2015-2016, he co-hosted sports radio talk shows on ESPN Radio KFNC Houston and SB Nation Radio with Sean Salisbury, with whom he also worked at ESPN.

In 2017, Bunin joined KING-TV as a news anchor.

Awards and honors
Bunin won three Associated Press awards for sportscasting in 1998 and 2000 in Arizona and Michigan.

In 2010, Bunin became the first anchor at ESPN to win the company’s prestigious “Game Ball” award for character.  In 2012, he received the President's Volunteer Service Award from Barack Obama, for his volunteer efforts, primarily with at-risk teens.

In 2011, Sports Illustrated’s media critic Richard Deitsch called Bunin "one of the most underrated talents in sports journalism." In Sports Illustrated's 2011 Media Awards, Bunin was declared one of the "Twelve Broadcasters Viewers Deserve More Of In 2012."

While at ESPN, Bunin won an Emmy Award as part of the team on SportsCenter.

Since leaving ESPN, he has won three Regional Emmy Awards, and he has been nominated for 12 Emmys, including Best News Anchor every year since moving to KING-5 (winning that award in 2021).

References

External links
Seattle Times: Painful path from hospital to anchor desk

Living people
ESPN announcers
American Jews
American television sports announcers
Television anchors from Seattle
S.I. Newhouse School of Public Communications alumni
Year of birth missing (living people)
Mercer Island High School alumni